Father of the Pride is a 2004–2005 American adult animated sitcom created by Jeffrey Katzenberg for DreamWorks Animation that was part of a short-lived trend of CGI series in prime-time network television (after Game Over). The series centers on a family of white lions, the patriarch of which stars in a Siegfried & Roy show in Las Vegas. Despite heavy promotion, the series was considered a "flop" as it was cancelled after only one season. Transmission and production were also delayed by the real-life on-stage injury of Roy Horn in October 2003.

The family was conceived by Katzenberg when he visited Siegfried & Roy's Secret Garden in Las Vegas in 2002.

Premise
The show revolves around the adventures of a family of white lions, consisting of father Larry, the bumbling yet well-intentioned star of Siegfried & Roy's show; Kate, a pretty, stay-at-home mother who is a member of a special women's group; Sierra, their teenage daughter who is constantly annoyed by her family; Hunter, their awkward young son, who is a huge fan of The Lord of the Rings; Sarmoti, Kate's father and Sierra and Hunter's grandfather who has a dislike for Larry; and Snack, Larry's mischievous gopher friend.

Recurring characters appear alongside the lion family; these include Larry's friends Roger, Chutney, Vincent, and Nelson; Larry's rival Blake and his wife Victoria; Sarmoti's friends Bernie, Duke, Chaz, and the Snout Brothers; Hi Larious; Kate's friends Foo-Lin, Lily, and Brittany; two lesbian gophers Chimmi & Changa; and Sierra's boyfriend Justin.

Development

It took more than 200 animators 2 years to make Father of the Pride. Computer animation was produced at Imagi Animation Studios in Hong Kong.

The series employed a small group of seasoned directors, which included Mark Risley, Bret Haaland, Steve Hickner, John Holmquist, John Stevenson, and Mark Baldo. Felix Ip served as creative director for Imagi. For the first season, DreamWorks created 30 principal sets, 500 special props, and about 100 characters. In fact, a typical episode unfolds across all 30 principal sets and features two or three unique locations as well. The lion habitat is inspired by the real Secret Garden in Las Vegas, where the actual Siegfried & Roy lions reside. In Father of the Pride, the Secret Garden encompasses residences for the main characters and their families and public areas ranging from the community bar to a school classroom.

Since Larry and his family drive the story lines for most of the episodes, their residence is the most detailed, comprising separate, contiguous sets for the living room, the kitchen, and the children's bedrooms. Meanwhile, the assets are stored in individual files in order to be loaded into separate layers and assembled modularly.

Voice cast

Major characters

Supporting characters

Episodes

Production
In 2002, Jeffrey Katzenberg came up with the idea for the series when he visited Siegfried & Roy's show in Las Vegas: "I thought, I wonder what it's like for those lions. What must life be like from their point of view? [They're] living in Las Vegas, trying to raise a family and earn a living. In animation, we look for those things — a way to look at our lives through a fantasy world. It allows us to take on subjects that are too difficult to do with real people. It allows us to be more controversial. Edgier. There can be parody and innuendo and satire. Things can be sophisticated in a way that even our feature films can't be."

According to Katzenberg, the series was created for "an 18- to 49-year-old. It's not about checking to make sure you don't leave the 6-, 7- and 8-year-olds behind. This is purely an adult show."

Each episode cost an estimated $2 million to $2.5 million to produce, making it at the time of its release one of the most expensive half-hour television comedies ever.

Long before its broadcast, the series was nearly cancelled, following the near-death of Roy Horn in October 2003; but after his condition improved, Siegfried & Roy urged NBC to continue production. Katzenberg recalled, "There was a short period of time where we all just rocked out on our heels and couldn't be particularly creative and certainly not very funny. But Siegfried kept saying, every step of the way, that this show meant so much to them. So much to Roy. Then, even more than it ever did."

Opening sequence
The opening sequence starts off with a red sports car, with the Nevada license plate "MAGIC1," being driven by Siegfried and Roy past many of the attractions in Las Vegas. Cast names are presented on the marquees of the Strip hotels that, along with the Mirage, belonged to the MGM / Mirage Group at the time, before the car swerves into the Mirage Hotel. The scene then changes to the lions' house. Larry (voiced by John Goodman) gets woken up by his wife Kate (voiced by Cheryl Hines), late for his performance, on the couch before dashing towards the stage (but not before having a beer given to him by Snack {voiced by Orlando Jones} at the Watering Hole). Larry sings a rendition of Elvis Presley's "Viva Las Vegas" as the background music throughout the title sequence.

Release and reception
The series' debut on NBC on August 31, 2004 attracted 12.3 million viewers, making it the most-watched series of the week on American television. However, the series was expected to do better, especially considering heavy promotion during NBC's coverage of the 2004 Summer Olympics in Athens, Greece. Its opening ranked only the 13th of 16 fall comedies that NBC introduced since 1999.

When the series debuted, it got off to a good start with strong ratings. The ratings continued to show good promise for the series through early September 2004 until the ratings started to rapidly decline. Many airings were repeatedly interrupted by updates on the 2004 presidential election, and by that point, there had been such a glut of advertising that audiences were sick of it. By November 2004, it was pulled from NBC's sweeps line-up. In early December, Jeffrey Katzenberg announced that he did not think the series would be picked up for a second season. Over the next few months, the network aired several of the remaining episodes outside of sweeps periods, but the series did not return for a second season. A few of the remaining episodes were burned off in late December 2004.

Father of the Pride received a negative response from television critics, who considered it to be little more than a gimmick and a shill for other NBC and DreamWorks properties (two early episodes extensively featured The Today Shows Matt Lauer and another featured Donkey from the Shrek franchise). Also, many television critics noticed that the series' humor was very similar to South Park (one episode even had a character say, "Screw you guys, I'm goin' home!").

According to Katzenberg, Siegfried & Roy's reactions were more positive: "They laughed. A lot. They kept asking us to create more contradiction. Literally, one's blond and one's dark, and every aspect of their life is as black and white as that. They are always playful with one another, always playing tricks on one another. They encouraged us to have fun with that."

Protest from the Parents Television Council
In October 2004, the Parents Television Council's launched a campaign against Father of the Pride. Reasons cited for their opposition were the aforementioned use of anthropomorphic animals and the use of "from the creators of Shrek" in their promotions. The film in question was seen by the Council as much more family-friendly than this series, which the PTC stated could inadvertently draw the wrong audience based on the way it was promoted by NBC. Their campaign led to over 11,000 complaints to the Federal Communications Commission. In March 2006, the FCC ruled that the show was not indecent.

Home media
Father of the Pride was released on DVD on June 7, 2005, containing the original pilot, an alternate pilot (which draws heavily on the original), an unaired episode, and one episode that was voice-recorded and not animated (and therefore, remains at the storyboard stage).

Broadcast
Father of the Pride premiered in the United States on August 31, 2004, on NBC.

In the United Kingdom, the series premiered on March 6, 2005, originally on Channel 4 and Sky One.

In Canada, the series premiered on September 5, 2008, on Teletoon Detour.

Awards and nominations
Father of the Pride won an Annie Award in 2005 for Character Design in an Animated Television Production. It was also nominated for a 2005 People's Choice Award in the category Favorite New TV Comedy Series.

References

External links

 

American adult computer-animated television series
2004 American television series debuts
2005 American television series endings
2000s American adult animated television series
2000s American sitcoms
2000s American black comedy television series
American adult animated comedy television series
American animated sitcoms
Television series by DreamWorks Animation
English-language television shows
NBC original programming
Television shows set in the Las Vegas Valley
Animated television series about lions
Animated television series about families